Irene Yolanda Ravache Paes de Melo (born 6 August 1944) is a Brazilian film, stage, and television actress. In 2008, she was nominated for an International Emmy Award for her role in Eterna Magia.

Personal life
Ravache is married to journalist Edison Paes de Melo and has two children.

Filmography

Film
2005 - Depois Daquele Baile .... Dóris
2002 - Viva Sapato! .... Isolda
2001 - Amores Possíveis
1999 - Até que a Vida Nos Separe 
1997 - Ed Mort
1989 - Que Bom Te Ver Viva
1978 - Doramundo
1978 - Curumim
1975 - Lição de Amor .... Láura
1974 - O Supermanso
1972 - Geração em Fuga

Television
 2012 - Guerra dos Sexos .... Charlotte de Alcântara Pereira Barreto (Charlô II/Cumbuqueta/Altamiranda)
 2010 - Passione .... Clotilde Iolanda de Souza
 2008 - Faça Sua História .... Nadir
 2008 - Dicas de um Sedutor .... Dolores
 2007 - Eterna Magia .... Loreta O'Neill
 2007 - Amazônia, de Galvez a Chico Mendes .... Beatriz (segunda fase)
 2005 - Belíssima .... Katina Solomos Güney
 2003 - A Casa das Sete Mulheres .... Madalena Aguilar
 2000 - Marcas da Paixão .... Dete
 1999 - Suave Veneno .... Eleonor Cerqueira
 1996 - Razão de Viver .... Luzia
 1995 - Sangue do Meu Sangue .... Princesa Isabel
 1994 - Éramos Seis .... Lola
 1990 - Brasileiras e Brasileiros
 1987 - Sassaricando .... Leonora Lammar
 1983 - Champagne .... Antônia Regina
 1983 - Guerra dos Sexos .... Bárbara
 1982 - Sol de Verão .... Rachel
 1982 - Elas por Elas .... Amiga de Márcia
 1979 - Cara a Cara .... Zeny
 1977 - O Profeta ....Teresa
 1975 - A Viagem .... Estela
 1974 - O Machão .... Dinorá
 1972 - Na Idade do Lobo .... Cláudia
 1970 - Simplesmente Maria .... Inez
 1969 - Super Plá .... Majô Prado
 1967 - Sublime Amor .... Gina
 1967 - O Grande Segredo .... Zuleika
 1966 - Eu Compro Esta Mulher
 1965 - Paixão de Outono

Awards and nominations

APCA Awards

Art Quality Brazil Awards

Best of the Year – Globe Awards

Brasília Film Festival

Brazilian Film Festival of Miami

Contigo! Awards

Emmy Awards

Extra Television Awards

Grande Otelo

Guarani Film Awards

Mambembe Awards

Molière Awards

Press Trophy

Quem Awards

Shell Awards

References

External links
 

1944 births
Brazilian film actresses
Brazilian telenovela actresses
Living people